is a Japanese company mainly involved in textile and clothing production. It manufactures textile products and their raw materials, and sells men's and women's clothing.

On May 15, 2020, Renown filed for bankruptcy after it struggled to collect substantial debts owed to them by their Chinese owner and the COVID-19 pandemic hit sales sharply.

Operations 
Renown also operates retail stores throughout the world. It also has interests in store design, real estate, and food processing. As of 2009, the company had 51 subsidiaries and six associated companies.

Motorsport 
Renown is perhaps best known outside of their home country for having sponsored Mazda from the late 1980s to the early 1990s, with their branding (as well as that of their sportswear brand, Charge) appearing on the 1991 Le Mans-winning Mazda 787B.

References

Companies of Japan
Manufacturing companies of Japan
Clothing retailers of Japan
Retail companies established in 2004